A Maiba or an Amaiba (literally, "priest") is a male religious leader authorised to perform the sacred rites and rituals of Sanamahism (Meitei religion), especially as a mediatory agent between human beings and one or more deities. They have the authority or power to administer religious rites as well as sacrifices to gods. Their office or institution is called Maiba Loishang (Maiba Loisang), later renamed as Pandit Loisang, during Aryanisation of Meitei culture. They also served as healers, doctors, magicians, medicine men, physicians and shamans.
They play important roles in the ancestor worship (apokpa khurumjaba) ceremony.
Chief priest or chief among the maibas is called Maichou, a term formed with the amalgamation of two words ("maiba"- priest, "achouba"- big, chief, great).
Since their position is not hereditary, they acquire their positions through talent and skills. The female counterpart of a Maiba is a Maibi.

Gallery

Other websites

References 

Sanamahism
Meitei folklore
Meitei culture
Pages with unreviewed translations